The 2009 Thai FA Cup Final was the 16th final of the Thailand's domestic football cup competition, the FA Cup. The final was played at Suphachalasai Stadium in Bangkok on 23 October 2009. The match was contested by Thai Port, who beat Osotspa Saraburi 2–0 in their semi-final, and BEC Tero Sasana who beat TTM Samut Sakhon 3–0 on penalty shoot-out after 3–3 draw in the match. After Wuttichai Tathong opened the scoring in 14th minute, Edvaldo equalised in the 23rd minute before the draw and Thai Port beat BEC Tero Sasana after a penalty shoot-out.

Road to the final

Note: In all results below, the score of the finalist is given first (H: home; A: away; TPL: Clubs from Thai Premier League; D1: Clubs from Thai Division 1 League; D2: Clubs from Regional League Division 2).

Match

Summary
BEC Tero Sasana took the lead in the 14th minute when Wuttichai Tathong headed home an inviting cross from Noppol Pitafai. However, Thai Port drew level nine minutes later when Edvaldo scored after the ball rebounded off BEC Tero goalkeeper Sivaruck Tedsungnoen. The score remained until the end of extra time, forcing both teams into a penalty shoot-out.

Details

MATCH RULES
90 minutes.
30 minutes of extra-time if necessary.
Penalty shootout if scores still level.
Nine named substitutes
Maximum of 3 substitutions.

References

Thai FA Cup finals
1
Thai FA Cup Final 2009